Wehrmann is a German habitational surname for someone from any of various places called Wehr, Wehre, or Wehren. Notable people with the name include:

 Hans Wehrmann (born 1964), German entrepreneur, economist, inventor and author of literature in scientific management
 Henry Wehrmann (19th century), American engraver
 Jan Wehrmann (born 1969), German former professional footballer
 Jordy Wehrmann (born 1999), Dutch professional footballer

German-language surnames
German toponymic surnames